Ladies singles or Women's singles may refer to:

 Individual female players competing one-on-one in some sports including:
 tennis
 badminton
 pickleball
 squash
 table tennis
 professional wrestling
 match play in golf
 Single skating for ladies

See also
 Singles (disambiguation)
 Single (disambiguation)
 Lady (disambiguation)
 Single Ladies (disambiguation)